Lagan may refer to:

Entertainment
 Lagan (1941 film), Indian Bollywood film
 Lagan (1955 film), a Bollywood film
Lagan (1971 film), Bollywood film
 Lagaan, 2001 Indian epic sports-drama film
 "Lagan", a song by the Afro Celt Sound System from the album Volume 3: Further in Time

Places
 Lagan Valley (Assembly constituency), in the Northern Ireland Assembly
 Lagan Valley (Northern Ireland Parliament constituency)
 Lagan Valley (UK Parliament constituency)
 Lagan Valley, valley in Northern Ireland
 Lagan, County Armagh, a townland in County Armagh, Northern Ireland
 Lagan, Iran, a village in Markazi Province, Iran
 Lagan, Russia, a town in the Republic of Kalmykia, Russia
 Lagan, Sweden, a locality in Ljungby Municipality, Sweden, named after the river

Other uses
 Lagan, payment by lessee to the landlord in lieu of lease
 Lagan College, the first integrated school in Northern Ireland
 Lagan (Sweden), a river in southwestern Sweden
 River Lagan, river in Northern Ireland
 , a ferry operating in the Irish Sea
 Flotsam, jetsam, lagan, and derelict, shipwrecked goods

See also
Laggan (disambiguation)
Lagansky (disambiguation)